Phinehas Abraham (died 19 February 1887) was a West Indian merchant who was born in the island of Jamaica about the beginning of the nineteenth century. He was one of the last survivors of the body of West Indian merchants who contributed in a high degree to the prosperity of the West Indian colonial possessions. In former years Abraham was one of the largest landed proprietors in the island of Jamaica. He held various offices outside the Jewish community. He was senior justice of the peace for the parish of Trelawny in Jamaica, an agent of Lloyd's of London and the last surviving captain in the Trelawny militia. He was also one of the earliest members of West London Synagogue.

References

1887 deaths
Jamaican businesspeople
Jamaican Jews
Year of birth unknown
Burials at Balls Pond Road Cemetery
Jamaican justices of the peace